The black-billed capercaillie (Tetrao urogalloides), also known as eastern capercaillie, Siberian capercaillie, spotted capercaillie or (in Russian) stone capercaillie, is a large grouse species closely related to the more widespread western capercaillie. It is a sedentary species which breeds in the larch taiga forests of eastern Siberia as well as parts of northern Mongolia and China. In the far west of its distribution, the black-billed capercaillie has been known to hybridize with the western capercaillie. Compared to its western cousin, the Siberian capercaillie is also more adaptable to open habitat, given the larch forests it lives in are usually less dense than other taiga communities. Thus, they tend to avoid thick coniferous forests.

Description

Compared to the western capercaillie, it is slightly smaller in size with a slimmer body profile and longer neck, has a black beak (hence its name) instead of being horn-colored, and a longer, more spatulate tail. The eastern capercaillie has a somewhat glossy bluish-black head & neck down to a metallic turquoise breast. Distinct white markings at the tips of its upper and undertail coverts, as well as the wing coverts and flanks, give this grouse the nickname 'spotted capercaillie'. The female is similar to that of its western counterpart, except that its plumage is grayer overall with more heavily scaled underparts, lacks a solid rufous chest unlike the wood grouse, and has noticeably larger white spots on its wing and tail coverts.

Behavior 
From the crack of dawn until late morning, male capercaillies in the spring display by fanning out their tails, puffing their chest feathers out, lowering their wings, and angling their heads upward with an open beak to defend their space from other males and win over the mating rights of females. The size of the males' territories were usually , similar to black grouse territories, based on a research project by the University of Nebraska. A group of hens will carefully squat with drooping wings while the lekking male is present to signal that they're ready for breeding. It consists of a series of loud repeating clicks ascending in tempo. Other performances used to attract females involve flutter flights. They jump off the ground (> high,  far have been recorded) and rapidly beat their wings during takeoff and landing, generating a thundering flurry that resonates through the dense stands of conifers.

Taxonomy 
The black-billed capercaillie has two recognized subspecies:

 T. u. kamtschaticus (Kittlitz, 1858) - the Kamchatka peninsula
 T. u. urogalloides (nominate) (Middendorff, 1853) - northeastern Asia

References

black-billed capercaillie
Birds of North Asia
black-billed capercaillie
black-billed capercaillie